The 1968 Barnet Council election took place on 9 May 1968 to elect members of Barnet London Borough Council in London, England. The whole council was up for election and the Conservative party stayed in overall control of the council. There were 60 seats divided into 20 wards of 3 seats each. The Conservatives won 56 seats, Labour 3 and the Liberals 1. There were also 5 aldermen, all of whom were Conservatives. The first election to Barnet Council was in 1964, and it acted as a shadow council until the London Borough of Barnet was established in 1965. No comparisons are possible between the 1964 and 1968 elections due to changes in the boundaries and the total number of councillors.

Election result
Overall turnout in the election was 40.8%.

|}

Ward results

Arkley

Brunswick Park

Burnt Oak

Childs Hill

Colindale

East Barnet

East Finchley

Edgware

Finchley

Friern Barnet

Garden Suburb

Golders Green

Hadley

Hale

Hendon

Mill Hill

St Paul’s

Totteridge

West Hendon

Woodhouse

By-elections between 1968 and 1971

Colindale

Friern Barnet

Hadley

Childs Hill

References

1968
1968 London Borough council elections